Mr Darwin's Shooter is a 1998 novel by Roger McDonald. It describes the life of Syms Covington, manservant to Charles Darwin during Darwin's voyage aboard HMS Beagle.

Among the many animals Syms Covington shot and prepared for Charles Darwin were the Galápagos finches, which became crucial for his theory.

Awards and nominations
 1999 NSW Premier's Award for Fiction,
 1999 Victorian Premier's Award for Fiction,
 2000 National Fiction Award,
 2000 SA Premier's Literary Award

1998 Australian novels
Australian historical novels
Novels set in the 19th century
Cultural depictions of Charles Darwin